The Mercedes-Benz M114 engine is a straight-six Otto cycle engine with dual two-barrel Zenith 35/40 INAT carburetors or with Bosch D-Jetronic fuel injection system. The engine displaced .  The engine develops 146 SAE hp, has a maximum speed of 6300 rpm with a 9:1 compression ratio.it was made in America.

See also
List of Mercedes-Benz engines

External links

M114
Straight-six engines